Johan or Jöns was the name of several archbishops of Uppsala:

Johan (archbishop of Uppsala, died 1187)
Johan Odulfsson (died 1284)
Johan (archbishop of Uppsala, died 1291)
Jöns Gerekesson (archbishop 1408–1421)
Johan Håkansson (archbishop 1421–1432)
Jöns Bengtsson Oxenstierna (archbishop 1448–1467)
Johannes Magnus (archbishop 1523–1544)
Johannes Canuti Lenaeus (archbishop 1647–1669)
Johan Baazius the younger (archbishop 1677–1681)
Johannes Steuchius (archbishop 1730–1742)
Johan Olof Wallin (archbishop 1837–1839)
Johan August Ekman (archbishop 1900–1913)